Staffordia is a genus of air-breathing land snails, terrestrial pulmonate gastropod mollusks in the family Staffordiidae.

Species 
Species within the genus Staffordia include:

 Staffordia daflaensis
 Staffordia staffordi
 Staffordia toruputuensis

References

External links

Staffordiidae